An incomplete list of events in 1302 in Italy:

Events
 Peace of Caltabellotta

Births
 Andrew Corsini

Deaths
 Cimabue
 Gerardo Bianchi
 Lotterio Filangieri
 Matthew of Aquasparta

Italy
Italy
Years of the 14th century in Italy